Liberal Revolution may refer to:
Liberal Revolution of 1820, in Portugal
Liberal rebellions of 1842, in Brazil
Liberal Revolution of 1854, in Peru
Liberal Era (1895–1925), in Ecuador
Colour revolution